Head and Shoulders may refer to:
 Head and shoulders (chart pattern), employed in technical analysis, which is a method of stock market prediction
 "Head and Shoulders" (short story), a short story by F. Scott Fitzgerald first published in 1920
 Head & Shoulders, a brand of shampoo by Procter & Gamble

See also
 "Head, Shoulders, Knees and Toes", a children's song